Johan Håkansson (Latinized to Johannes Haquini) (died 1432) was Archbishop of Uppsala, Sweden, 1421–1432.

Biography
His first known occupations were at a school in Söderköping and as a canon in Linköping. In 1411 he enrolled at Vadstena monastery. In 1418 he was sent on an important assignment to Rome, from where he returned in 1420.

In 1421 the previous Archbishop of Uppsala, Jöns Gerekesson resigned. Three new candidates were presented to the Swedish King Eric of Pomerania, of whom he chose Johan Håkansson.

Haquini's history as a monk set the standards for his time as archbishop. He allowed the clerics to be freed from taxes, and he built a permanent house for the archbishop (demolished during Gustav Vasa's liberation war in 1522).

See also 
 Archbishop of Uppsala

References 
 Nordisk familjebok, in Swedish

Further reading 
 Klosterfolket i Vadstena, Silfverstolpe, 1899.

1432 deaths
Roman Catholic archbishops of Uppsala
15th-century Roman Catholic archbishops in Sweden
Year of birth unknown